The 2012 ITU Triathlon World Cup was a series of triathlon races organised by the International Triathlon Union (ITU) for elite-level triathletes held during the 2012 season. For 2012, nine races were announced as part of the World Cup series. Each race was held over a distance of 1500 m swim, 40 km cycle, 10 km run (an Olympic-distance triathlon). Alongside a prize purse, points were awarded at each race contributing towards the overall 2012 ITU World Triathlon Series point totals. Eight of the nine stops in the world cup series are repeat destinations, with the stop in Banyoles, Spain being a new venue location for the cup.

Triathlon World Cup schedule

Event results

Mooloolaba

Ishigaki

Huatulco

Banyoles

Edmonton

Tiszaújváros

Guatapé

Tongyeong

Cancún

See also
2012 ITU World Triathlon Series

References

2012
World Cup